Inventory is a 1989 Polish drama film directed by Krzysztof Zanussi. It was entered into the 16th Moscow International Film Festival.

Cast
 Krystyna Janda as Julia
 Artur Żmijewski as Tomek
 Maja Komorowska as Zofia
 Andrzej Łapicki as Tomek's Father
 Artur Barciś as Neighbour
 Tadeusz Bradecki as Priest
 Adam Bauman as Official

References

External links
 

1989 films
1989 drama films
1980s Polish-language films
Films directed by Krzysztof Zanussi
Films scored by Wojciech Kilar
Polish drama films